Emamiyeh-e Sofla (also Romanized as Emāmīyeh-ye Soflá and Emāmīyeh Soflá; also known as Sagān, Sagān-e Pā’īn, and Sagān-e Sofla') is a village in Qaleh Shahin Rural District, in the Central District of Sarpol-e Zahab County, Kermanshah Province, Iran. At the 2006 census, its population was 810, in 174 families.

References 

Populated places in Sarpol-e Zahab County